The Torridincolidae are a small family of beetles in the suborder Myxophaga. It contains these genera:

 Claudiella Reichardt & Vanin, 1976
 Delevea Reichardt, 1976
 Iapir Py-Daniel, da Fonseca & Barbosa, 1993
 Incoltorrida Steffan, 1973
 Satonius Endrödy-Younga, 1997
 Torridincola Steffan, 1964
 Ytu Reichardt, 1973

References

Myxophaga
Beetle families